This list of museums in South Australia contains museums which are defined for this context as institutions (including nonprofit organizations, government entities, and private businesses) that collect and care for objects of cultural, artistic, scientific, or historical interest and make their collections or related exhibits available for public viewing. Also included are non-profit art galleries and university art galleries.

See also
List of museums in Australia

References

 South Australian Community History: Organisations
South Australian History Network 

South Australia

Museums
Lists of tourist attractions in South Australia